Yarnemia ascidiformis is a fossil tentatively classified as a tunicate. While Y. ascidiformis looks similar to tunicates, the oldest unequivocal tunicate, Shankouclava dates to the Cambrian period, while Y. ascidiformis is Ediacaran in age.

Etymology
The generic name Yarnemia comes from the village of Yarnema near which the first specimens were found. The specific epithet, ascidiformis, refers to the likeness to ascidians.

See also
Other Ediacaran biota tentatively identified as tunicates include
 Ausia fenestrata
 Burykhia hunti

References

Ediacaran life
Tunicate genera
Prehistoric chordate genera
Fossil taxa described in 1984